Lullaby for a Monster is an album led by saxophonist Dexter Gordon recorded in 1976 and released on the Danish SteepleChase label in 1981.

Reception

In his review for AllMusic, Scott Yanow said "this Dexter Gordon album features him in a surprisingly sparse setting. ...he is up to the challenge and his lengthy solos never lose one's interest".

Track listing

 "Nursery Blues" (Dexter Gordon) - 6:02
 "Lullaby for a Monster" (Niels-Henning Ørsted Pedersen) - 6:32
 "On Green Dolphin Street" (Bronisław Kaper, Ned Washington) - 6:39
 "Good Bait" (Tadd Dameron) - 8:29 Bonus track on CD reissue 		
 "Born to Be Blue" (Mel Tormé, Robert Wells) - 8:14
 "Tanya" (Donald Byrd) - 10:24

Personnel

Dexter Gordon - tenor saxophone
Niels-Henning Ørsted Pedersen - bass 
Alex Riel - drums

References

1981 albums
Dexter Gordon albums
SteepleChase Records albums